Cymindis scapularis is a species of ground beetle in the subfamily Harpalinae. It was described by Schaum in 1857.

References

scapularis
Beetles described in 1857